Doubling is a central method in psychodrama and is also used in other forms of therapy and counseling. In mediation, for example, it is an aid when translating between disputing parties in conflict resolution and is, therefore, a mediation strategy. Difficult content can be transported from one conflict partner to another by the mediator. The mediator presents the statement in such a way that the person addressed understands it and the person who is doubled still recognizes it as his.

In humanistic psychodrama, a double is a group member who appears next to the protagonist during the protagonist-centered work. In a holistic communication process, supported by body language alignment, the inner experience of the protagonist is clarified, conveyed to the group, and among other things, promoted knowledge and insight.

This game is made possible by the constant process of interaction between the group members as a double and auxiliary ego (fellow player), the protagonist and the therapeutic leader. It also develops its effect through dynamic processes within the group, which is why the protagonist game can also serve as a group therapeutic intervention. 

Since the double process is to be understood as a communicative process, it always includes properties and effects in a larger context. Neither individual properties of the double nor the mechanisms of action of individual properties can be seen in isolation without understanding them in terms of a process-like change. It must be taken into account that the relationship structure between the protagonist and the double is expressed in the properties of the double and can be perceived there so that the properties do not have to be considered separately with regard to the interactive events. So the double does not enter the double process with modified properties but develops these properties in the interaction with the protagonist. 

An extensive empirical study of the double process by Hans-Werner Gessmann 1996 describes 10 double types in humanistic psychodrama which can be distinguished in their effect on the protagonist and which are characterized by different characteristics:

Effects in therapeutic psychodrama 

 
Effects in therapeutic psychodrama
Highly significant correlations to specific effects in the protagonist are ascribed to the following properties of the doubles: Provocative behavior in the doubles leads to a confrontation with the protagonist. If the double can formulate well, it achieves an activation in the protagonist. If the double sees connections, this leads to clarity for the protagonist. If the double stays on the ball, this leads to knowledge, insight, and reflection in the protagonist. If the double adjust to the protagonist, help is given to him and a feeling of calm is triggered. If the double is very experienced, the protagonist experiences an activation.

The doubles describe four impact groups

Double types who act stringently, cognitively, experienced and empathetic are perceived by the protagonist as helpful in coping with his conflict resolution (types 3, 6, 1, 5), whereas double types who acted judgmental, urging, patronizing (types 10, 9, 8) were perceived by the protagonist as not helpful or even as aggravating the conflict.

Since the double process is to be understood as a communicative process, it always includes properties and effects in a larger context. Neither individual properties of the double nor the mechanisms of action of individual properties can be seen in isolation without understanding them in terms of a process-like change. It must be taken into account that the relationship structure between the protagonist and the double is expressed in the properties of the double and can be perceived there so that the properties do not have to be considered separately with regard to the interactive events. So the double does not enter the double process with modified properties but develops these properties in the interaction with the protagonist.

References 

Hudgins, K. & Toscani, F. (2013).  "Healing World Trauma with the Therapeutic Spiral Model:  Stories at the Frontlines".  London:  Jessica Kingsley Publications. 

Gessmann, H.-W. & Meyer, M. (1997). Die Bedeutung von Aspekten der Körpersprache beim Doppelprozeß im Humanistischen Psychodrama – eine empirische Studie. In: Internationale Zeitschrift für Humanistisches Psychodrama. (Hrsg. Hans-Werner Gessmann). 3. Jahrgang, Heft 2, Dez 1997, Verlag des Psychotherapeutischen Instituts Bergerhausen, Duisburg, S. 30–51 ISSN 0949-3018

Gessmann, H.-W. (1995). Die therapeutische Wirksamkeit der Doppelmethode im Humanistischen Psychodrama. In: Internationale Zeitschrift für Humanistisches Psychodrama. (Hrsg. Hans-Werner Gessmann). 1. Jahrgang, Heft 2, Dez 1995, Verlag des Psychotherapeutischen Instituts Bergerhausen, Duisburg, S. 5–23 ISSN 0949-3018

Psychodrama